This is a list of roads designated A10. Roads entries are sorted in the countries alphabetical order.

 A010 road (Argentina), a road in the northeast of Chubut Province
 A10 road (Australia) may refer to :
 A10 highway (South Australia) may refer to :
 North East Road in South Australia
 Adelaide-Mannum Road in South Australia
 A10 highway (Tasmania) may refer to :
 Lyell Highway, a road that connects the south of the state with the West Coast
 Murchison Highway, a road that connects the north of the state with the west coast
 Zeehan Highway, a road that connects the above two roads on the west coast
 A10 motorway (Austria), a road connecting Salzburg and Villach
 A10 road (Belgium), a road connecting Brussels and Ostend 
 A10 Road (Botswana), a road connecting Gaborone and Kanye
 A10 road (Canada) may refer to :
 A10 expressway (Quebec), a road connecting the Ville-Marie Expressway and the Champlain Bridge in Montreal
 A10 highway (Croatia), a road connecting Metković and Ploče
 A10 motorway (France), a road connecting Paris and Bordeaux
 A10 motorway (Germany), a ring-road surrounding Berlin
 A10 motorway (Italy), a road connecting Genoa and Ventimiglia 
 A10 road (Latvia), a road connecting Riga and Ventspils
 A10 highway (Lithuania), a road connecting Panevėžys, Pasvalys and Bauska
 A10 road (Malaysia), a road in Perak connecting Kampung Changkat Petai and Tapah
 A10 motorway (Netherlands), a road around Amsterdam
 A-10 motorway (Spain), a road in Navarre connecting the A-15 and the A-1
 A 10 road (Sri Lanka), a road connecting Katugastota, Kurunegala and Puttalam
 A10 motorway (Switzerland), a road connecting Muri bei Bern and Rüfenacht
 A10 road (United Kingdom) refers to :
 A10 road (England), a major north–south road
 A10 road (Isle of Man), a road connecting Ballaugh and Ramsey
 A10 road (United States of America) may refer to :
 A10 road (California), a road in Siskiyou County connecting Mount Shasta City to a dead end at the foot of Mount Shasta
 A10 road (Zimbabwe), a road connecting Durban in South Africa and Mount Darwin via Harare
 A10 motorway (Romania), a road planned to connect Sebeș to Turda (near Cluj-Napoca)

See also
 List of highways numbered 10